Robert H. McCabe (December 23, 1928 – December 23, 2014) was an American educator and the President Emeritus of Miami-Dade Community College.
He won a 1992 MacArthur Fellowship. He died on December 23, 2014 of cancer.

Works
No One to Waste: A Report to Public Decision-Makers and Community College Leaders, Community College Press, 2000, 
General education in a changing society, Kendall/Hunt Pub. Co., 1978,

References

American educators
Miami Dade College
MacArthur Fellows
2014 deaths
1928 births
Deaths from cancer in Florida